Legislative elections were held in France on 24 April and 8 May 1910. The elections resulted in a huge victory for the governing coalition of Radicals and Left Republicans (in large part due to the effective merger of the Radicals and Independent Radicals), allowing the incumbent premier Aristide Briand to form a second government.

Aristide Briand, himself an Independent Socialist, would unite his small, loosely-aligned, pro-government faction of socialists into the Republican-Socialist Party in 1911.

Results

Sources
L'Humanité 25 April 1910: Popular Vote
Le Matin 27 April 1910: Popular Vote
Le Matin 10 May 1910: Seats
https://www.france-politique.fr/elections-legislatives-1910.htm

References

Legislative elections in France
France
Legislative